Poorya "Nazar" Nazari (born July 1, 1986) is a professional poker player residing in Richmond Hill, Ontario.  He is the 2009 PokerStars Caribbean Adventure champion winning $3,000,000 for his finish, which is the largest prize in PCA history.

In November 2013, Nazari won the PokerStars Sunday 2nd Chance a second time for $47,257 playing under his alias, "isuckoutonu".

References

External links
 Poorya Nazari Hendon Mob profile

Canadian poker players
European Poker Tour winners
People from Richmond Hill, Ontario
Canadian people of Iranian descent
Living people
1986 births